The Left May – Kwomtari or Arai–Kwomtari languages are a possible small family of Papuan languages proposed by Malcolm Ross, which links the Left May (Arai) family with the  Kwomtari–Fas proposal (Loving & Bass 1964). However, the proposal is problematic; it's not clear if the Arai correspondences are with Kwomtari, with Fas, or with both, as Kwomtari–Fas is itself dubious.

Classification
 Left May or Arai family
Fas family: Baibai, Fas
? Kwomtari family:
 Guriaso language
 Kwomtari–Nai: Kwomtari, Nai (Biaka)
? Pyu family-level isolate (included in the Kwomtari languages by Laycock (1973), but not addressed by Ross)

Baron (1983) notes that most classifications, including Ross's, perpetuate an early copy error, placing Fas in the Kwomtari family and Nai in the Baibai family. This contradicts the original classification of Loving and Bass, which is supported by their field notes. (See Kwomtari–Baibai languages.) Taking this into account weakens the case for the Left May-Kwomtari proposals. Some relevant pronouns are shown below (Baron 1983):

It appears that for proto-Arai and proto-Fas a pronoun *atie might be reconstructed for "I", and a *wa for "s/he", while for Arai and Kwomtari perhaps *na and *amwa might be reconstructed for "you" and "they", with the former perhaps including Pyu as well. No pronouns obviously connect Kwomtari and Fas.

References

 , posted at: 
 
 
 

Languages of Papua New Guinea
Papuan languages
Proposed language families